The 2014 King Cup, or The Custodian of The Two Holy Mosques Cup, was the 39th season of King Cup since its establishment in 1957, and the 7th under the current edition.
Al-Ittihad was the defending champion but was eliminated by Al-Ahli in semi-finals.

Unlike the previous seasons where only eight teams participated, this season's competition featured a total of 32 teams. 14 teams of Pro league and 16 teams of 1st Division, and 2 teams qualifying from preliminary stage.

The final was held at the King Abdullah Sports City, in Jeddah. Al-Shabab won  their third title after beating Al-Ahli 3–0.

Round of 32

|}

Round of 16

|}

Quarter-finals

|}

Semi-finals

|}

First leg

Second leg

Final

Winner

References

2014
2013–14 in Saudi Arabian football
2013–14 domestic association football cups